Hirsch may refer to:

Places
 Hirsch, Saskatchewan, Canada
 Hirsch Observatory, in Troy, New York, U.S.

People 
 Afua Hirsch (born 1981), Norwegian-born British writer, broadcaster, and former barrister
 Alex Hirsch (born 1985), American animator, screenwriter and voice actor
 August Hirsch (1817–1894), German physician and medical historian
 Burkhard Hirsch (1930–2020), German politician and civil liberties advocate
 Cal Hirsch, 19th century American retailer
 Corey Hirsch (born 1972), Canadian ice hockey goaltender
 David Hirsch (disambiguation), several people
 Ed Hirsh (fl. from 1980), special effects artist  
 Edward Hirsch (born 1950), American poet and critic
 E. D. Hirsch (born 1928), American educator and literary critic
 Eike Christian Hirsch (1937–2022), German journalist, author and television presenter
 Elroy Hirsch (1923–2004), American football player
 Emanuel Hirsch (1888–1972), German Protestant theologian
 Emil G. Hirsch (1851–1923), American rabbi
 Emile Hirsch (born 1985), American actor
 Emile Hirsch (painter) (1832–1904), French stained glass artist
 Felix Hirsch (1902–1982, German-American journalist and historian
 George A. Hirsch (born 1934), American magazine publisher
 George Hirsch (musician) (born 1984), American musician
 Helmut Hirsch (1916–1937), German Jew and victim of the Nazis
 Jack Hirsch (born c. 1941), American basketball player
 Joe Hirsch (1928–2009), American horse racing columnist
 John Hirsch (1930–1989), Hungarian-Canadian theater director
 John A. Hirsch (1861–1938), American politician 
 Jorge E. Hirsch (born 1953), Argentine American professor of physics
 Judd Hirsch (born 1935), American actor
 Julio Hirsch (born 1956), better known as Julio Chávez, Argentine actor
 Julius Hirsch (1892–1945), Jewish German footballer and Holocaust victim
 Kurt Hirsch (1906–1986), German mathematician
 Lou Hirsch (born 1955), American actor
 Maurice Hirsch (footballer) (born 1993), German footballer
 Maurice de Hirsch (1831–1896), German-Jewish businessman and philanthropist
 Max Hirsch (labor economist) (1832–1905), German political economist and politician
 Max Hirsch (economist) (1852–1909), German-Australian businessman and economist 
 Morris Hirsch (born 1933) American mathematician
 Moshe Hirsch (1923 or 1924 – 2010), Israeli politician
 Moshe Hillel Hirsch, American/Israeli rabbi
 Paul Hirsch (politician) (1868–1940), German politician
 Paul Hirsch (bibliophile) (1881–1951), German industrialist, musicologist and bibliophile
 Paul Hirsch (film editor) (born 1945), American film editor
 Peter Hirsch (disambiguation), several people
 Rahel Hirsch (1870–1953),  German physician and professor
 Richard Hirsch (born 1944), American ceramic sculptor
 Robert L. Hirsch (fl. from 1979), energy research scientist
 Samson Raphael Hirsch (1808–1888), German rabbi
 Samuel Hirsch (1815–1889), German rabbi
 Slavko Hirsch (1893–1942), Croatian physician
 Sidney Mttron Hirsch (1883–1962), American model and playwright
 Stefan Hirsch (1899–1964), American artist
 Steven Hirsch (born 1961), adult entertainment executive
 Tomás Hirsch (born 1956), Chilean politician and businessman
 Werner Z. Hirsch (1920–2009), German-born American economist

See also 
 Baron de Hirsch Cemetery (disambiguation)
 Hirsh (disambiguation)
 Hersh, a given name and surname
 Hersch, a surname
 Hirsch conjecture, in mathematical programming and polyhedral combinatorics
 h-index, or Hirsch index, an author-level metric 

German-language surnames
Jewish surnames
Yiddish-language surnames
Surnames from nicknames
Surnames from ornamental names